The 1883 Cincinnati Red Stockings season was a season in American baseball. The team finished third in the American Association with a record of 61–37, 5 games behind the Philadelphia Athletics.

Regular season
The Red Stockings came into the 1883 season looking to repeat as American Association Champions, as they had a league best record of 55–25 in 1882.  During the off-season, the team announced that catcher Pop Snyder would return as player-manager. Cincinnati also made a big signing, as they signed Charley Jones, who played with the Cincinnati Reds of the National League from 1876–1878. Jones had not played professional baseball since 1880, when he played for the Boston Red Caps of the NL, after which he was black-balled from professional baseball. The Red Stockings also signed another former Reds player, John Reilly, who had also last played major league baseball for the Reds in the 1880 season.

On the diamond, the Red Stockings were led by Jones, who hit .294 with a team leading ten home runs, as well as a league leading 80 RBI. Reilly hit a team high .311 with nine homers and 79 RBI. On the mound, Will White continued to be the ace of the pitching staff, posting a 43–22 record with 64 complete games and a 2.09 ERA in 577 innings pitched.

Season summary 
Cincinnati started off the season on the right foot, winning their first four games, and had an impressive 11–5 record in their first sixteen ballgames. However, they were 3.5 games behind the Athletics. The Red Stockings would continue to play good baseball, and had a 31–23 record. However, they sat in fourth place. Cincinnati would then go on to win twelve of their next thirteen games to improve to 43–24. However, they only moved up to third place. The Red Stockings would remain in third place for the rest of the season, finishing the year at 61–37, five games behind the Athletics.

Season standings

Record vs. opponents

Roster

Player stats

Batting

Starters by position
Note: Pos = Position; G = Games played; AB = At bats; H = Hits; Avg. = Batting average; HR = Home runs; RBI = Runs batted in

Other batters
Note: G = Games played; AB = At bats; H = Hits; Avg. = Batting average; HR = Home runs; RBI = Runs batted in

Pitching

Starting pitchers
Note: G = Games pitched; IP = Innings pitched; W = Wins; L = Losses; ERA = Earned run average; SO = Strikeouts

Relief pitchers
Note: G = Games pitched; W = Wins; L = Losses; SV = Saves; ERA = Earned run average; SO = Strikeouts

References

External links
1883 Cincinnati Red Stockings season at Baseball Reference

Cincinnati Reds seasons
Cincinnati Red Stockings season
Cincinnati Reds